Holding Hands, Feeding Ducks is the first full-length album released by twee pop group the Brunettes. It was released in 2002 as a joint release between Lil' Chief Records and EMI New Zealand.

Track listing
All songs written by Jonathan Bree.

"The Moon in June Stuff" – 2:32
"Cupid" – 3:03
"Holding Hands, Feeding Ducks" – 4:05
"Talk to Jesus" – 3:17
"Dancefloor" – 2:47
"Summer Love" – 2:31
"Super Eight" – 3:22
"Jukebox" – 3:07
"Mafioso" – 3:15
"End of the Runway" – 3:32
"Cotton Candy" – 3:42
"Tell Her" – 2:01

Personnel
 Jonathan Bree — vocals, guitar, synthesizer
 Heather Mansfield — vocals, glockenspiel, harmonica, marimba, organ, piano
 Mike Hall — bass, flute, harmonium, vocals
 Kari Hammond — drums, percussion

External links
Lil' Chief Records: The Brunettes
Lil' Chief Records
The Brunettes on Myspace

2002 debut albums
The Brunettes albums
Lil' Chief Records albums